Masson is a French and Scottish surname, and may refer to:

 André Masson (1896–1987), a French artist
 André Masson (born 1950), a French economist
 Angela Masson (born 1951), an American pilot and artist
 Antoine Masson (1636–1700), a French engraver
 Antoine Masson (boxer), a Belgian boxer
 Charles Eadie Masson (1884–1954), a Canadian amateur ice hockey right winger
 Charles François Philibert Masson (1762–1807), a private secretary to the future Tsar Alexander I
 Charles Masson (1800–1853), the pseudonym of James Lewis, a British East India Company soldier and explorer
 David Masson (1822–1907), a Scottish writer
 David I. Masson (1915–2007), a Scottish science-fiction writer and librarian, grandson of David Orme Masson
 David Orme Masson (1858–1937), an Australian chemist, son of David Masson
 David Parkes Masson (1847–1915), a wealthy banker in India and distinguished philatelist 
 Didier Masson (1886–1950), a French pilot
 Diego Masson (born 1935), a French conductor, composer and percussionist
 Don Masson (born 1946), Scottish footballer
 Édouard Masson (1826–1875), a Canadian businessman and political figure
 Émile Masson (1888–1973), a Belgian professional road bicycle racer
 Émile Masson Jr. (1915–2011), a Belgian professional road bicycle racer, son of above
Elsie Rosaline Masson (1890–1935), Australian photographer, writer and traveller, daughter of David Orme Masson
 Forbes Masson (born 1963), a Scottish actor
 Francis Masson (1741–1805), a Scottish botanist and gardener
 Frédéric Masson (1847–1923), a French historian
 Gérard Masson (born 1936), a French composer
 Jean Papire Masson (1544–1611), a French scholar
 Jeffrey Moussaieff Masson (born 1941), a writer on Freudian psychoanalysis
 Joseph Masson (1791–1847), a Canadian businessman
 Laetitia Masson (born 1966), a French film director and screenwriter
 Maxime Masson (1867–1960), pastor for 52 years at the Catholic parish of Sainte-Thècle, Quebec, Canada
 Paul-Marie Masson (1882–1954), French composer and musicologist
 Paul Masson (1859–1940), a pioneer of California viticulture 
 Paul Masson (1876–1944), a French cyclist and 1896 Summer Olympian
 Robert le Masson (1365–1443), a supporter of Joan of Arc
 Louis-Rodrigue Masson (1833–1903), a Canadian politician
 Sophie Masson (born 1959), a French-Australian author
 Suzanne Masson (1901–1943), a French resistance fighter
 Thomas Lansing Masson (1866–1934), an American anthropologist, editor and author

See also
Mason (surname)

French-language surnames
Occupational surnames